Zhang Yong may refer to:

 Jack Yung Chang (Zhang Yong) (1911—1939), Chinese historian of mathematics, the second son of Zhang Shizhao
 Zhang Yong (politician) (born 1953), former director of the China Food and Drug Administration
 Zhang Yong (agronomist) (born 1956), Chinese agronomist
 Zhang Yong (restaurateur), Chinese billionaire restaurateur, founder of Haidilao
 Daniel Zhang or Zhang Yong (born 1972), CEO of Alibaba Group
 Zhang Yong (real estate developer), founder of Xinyuan Real Estate
 Zhang Yong (snooker player) (born 1995), Chinese snooker player